Syed Abu Rushd Matinuddin (known by his pen name Abu Rushd, 25 December 1919 – 23 February 2010) was a Bangladeshi writer.

Early life and career
Rushd started his career as an English lecturer in Hooghly Mohsin College. He moved to England in 1951 for studying English literature at the Exeter College, Oxford. He later taught English in Kolkata Islamia College, Dhaka College, Chittagong College, Rajshahi College and Jahangirnagar University. He retired from Jahangirnagar University in 1982.

Works
Rushd's first publication was a collection of short stories in 1939. In addition to six novels, he wrote 50 short stories, and a three-volume autobiography. Also, he was adept at translating literary works, both from Bengali to English and English to Bengali, including Shakespeare's poems. Moreover, he was a regular columnist for four Bangladeshi newspapers, writing opinion pieces.

Rushd translated some poems and songs of Lalon to English in 1964.

Novels
 Elomelo  (This and That, 1946)
 Samne Notun Din (A  New Day Ahead, 1951)
 Doba Holo Dighi (Pool becomes  Lake, 1960)
 Nongor (Anchor, 1967)
 Onishchito Ragini (The Unsure Tune, 1969)
 Sthagita Dwip (The Aborted Island, 1974)

Awards

Tamgha-e-Imtiaz (1963)
Bangla Academy Literary Award (1963)
Habib Bank Award (1970)
Ekushey Padak (1981)
Adamjee Literary Award
Nasiruddin Gold Medal (1992)
Alakta Literary Award (1992)
Bangla Sahitya Parisad Award (1993)
Sher-e-Bangla Gold Award (1992)
Lekhika Sangha Award  (1992)
Rotary Club Award  (1995)
Chattagram Sangskriti Kendro Farrukh Memorial Award (1999)

Personal life

Rush was married to Azija Rushd. His brother, Rashid Karim, was a novelist.

References

1919 births
2010 deaths
Bengali-language writers
Bangladeshi male novelists
Alumni of Exeter College, Oxford
Academic staff of Jahangirnagar University
Academic staff of Dhaka College
Recipients of Tamgha-e-Imtiaz
Recipients of the Ekushey Padak
Recipients of Bangla Academy Award
Place of death missing
Recipients of the Adamjee Literary Award
Dhaka College alumni
Pakistani writers
Pakistani expatriates in the United Kingdom
Writers from Kolkata